The 1990 Dartmouth Big Green football team was an American football team that represented Dartmouth College during the 1990 NCAA Division I-AA football season. The Big Green were co-champions of the Ivy League.

In its fourth under head coach Eugene "Buddy" Teevens, the team compiled a 7–2–1 record and outscored opponents 211 to 121. Peter Chapman and Richard Joyce were the team captains.

The Big Green's 6–1 conference record tied for first in the Ivy League standings. Dartmouth outscored Ivy opponents 147 to 65. Dartmouth shared the championship despite having defeated its co-champion, Cornell, in their head-to-head matchup.

The Big Green were unranked for most of the year, but entered the national Division I-AA top 20 toward the end of their six-game win streak, and were ranked No. 17 at the end of the year.

Dartmouth played its home games at Memorial Field on the college campus in Hanover, New Hampshire.

Schedule

References

Dartmouth
Dartmouth Big Green football seasons
Ivy League football champion seasons
Dartmouth Big Green football